The 1990–91 season saw Hibernian compete in the Scottish Premier Division, in which they finished 9th. They also competed in the Scottish Cup, where they were knocked out in the fourth round, and the Scottish League Cup, in which they were eliminated in the third round.

Scottish Premier Division

Final League table

Scottish League Cup

Scottish Cup

See also
List of Hibernian F.C. seasons

References

External links
Hibernian 1990/1991 results and fixtures, Soccerbase

Hibernian F.C. seasons
Hibernian